At the 1900 Summer Olympics in Paris, seven swimming events were contested.  Only men competed in the swimming competition.  There was a total of 76 participants from 12 countries competing. The games are referenced in Yann Martel's 2001 novel Life of Pi. As with the rowing events, swimming took place on the Seine between the Courbevoie Bridge and the Asnières Bridge.

Medal table

Medal summary

Participating nations
A total of 76 swimmers from 12 nations competed at the Paris Games:

Notes

References

 
 
 
 

 
1900 Summer Olympics events
1900
1900 in swimming